The Museum of Korean Modern Literature is a literature museum in Jangchung-dong, Jung-gu, Seoul, South Korea. There are numerous Xylophone exhibits.

See also
List of museums in South Korea

External links
Official site

Museums in Seoul
Korean literature
Jung District, Seoul
Literary museums in South Korea